Robert St Clair Grant (14 April 19328 November 2003) was an English actor, comedian and writer, best known for playing bus conductor Jack Harper in the television sitcom On the Buses, as well as its film spin-offs and stage version.

Early life
Grant was born in Hammersmith, West London, on 14April 1932, the son of Albert George Grant (19091985) and Florence (19092001), . He was educated at Aldenham School.

Early career

Grant trained as an actor at the Royal Academy of Dramatic Art, working in his spare time as a frozen food salesman and also (coincidentally, in view of his later career) as a bus driver. After doing national service in the Royal Artillery, he made his stage debut in 1952 as Sydney in Worm's Eye View at the Court Royal, Horsham. In 1954, he married Jean Hyett; the marriage would end in divorce.

Grant's first London appearance was in The Good Soldier Schweik at the Duke of York's Theatre in 1956, and he spent several years at the Theatre Royal Stratford East before getting the lead role in the musical Blitz! at the Adelphi Theatre in the West End for two years. In 1962, he married for the second time, to Christine Sally Kemp; they later divorced. In 1964, he appeared at the Piccadilly Theatre in Instant Marriage, a musical farce, for which he wrote the book and lyrics, with music by Laurie Holloway.

Grant had by now started to make film appearances, including Sparrows Can't Sing (1963), and the film version of Till Death Us Do Part (1969). He returned to the Theatre Royal, Stratford, in 1967, and starred in the satirical play Mrs Wilson's Diary as George Brown, the Foreign Secretary in Harold Wilson's Labour government; this play later transferred to the West End. After George Brown's resignation from the Government on 15March 1968, the character of George Brown was switched with Barbara Castle, as the plot required a cabinet minister.

In January of that year Grant appeared as The Major in a six-part radio comedy drama The 17-Jewelled Shockproof Swiss-Made Bomb, featuring Peter Coke. It was written by Roy Clarke and produced by Alan Ayckbourn. The programne was transmitted on the BBC Light Programme.

On the Buses
Grant played the bus conductor Jack Harper in the television sitcom On the Buses, which ran for 74 episodes between 1969 and 1973; he co-wrote 11 episodes, and one special, with co-star Stephen Lewis (who played Blakey, the Inspector). It was an instant success with the viewers, and led to three feature films On the Buses (1971), Mutiny on the Buses (1972) and Holiday on the Buses (1973). He was in a relationship with guest star Gaye Brown, until he broke up with her to date (and eventually marry) Kim Benwell. The series was the peak of his career; when Grant married for the third time in 1971, there were huge crowds outside the register office, and the couple had to abandon their hired Rolls-Royce and walk to the reception. A double-decker bus had been provided for the guests, but they had to walk as well.

Later years and death
When On the Buses finished, Grant found himself heavily typecast as Jack Harper and struggled to get other parts. He toured Australia in the farce No Sex Please, We're British, and continued to appear in musicals and pantomimes. In 1975, he wrote and starred in a one-off pilot Milk-O alongside his On the Buses co-star Anna Karen, an attempt to reinvigorate his career by means of a similar character, a milkman who spent his time fighting off amorous housewives he was delivering to. However, this did not lead to a series, and Grant never acted for television again. In 1981, he appeared in a touring production of the once-controversial revue Oh! Calcutta!, accompanied by a chorus line of naked men and women less than half his age.

In 1980, Grant played the title role in John Arden's BBC radio adaptation of Don Quixote, with Bernard Cribbins as Sancho Panza. In 1986, he played a cockney detective inspector in The Red Telephone Box, a comedy thriller by Ken Whitmore on BBC Radio 4. On stage he later played Autolycus in Shakespeare's The Winter's Tale for the Birmingham Repertory Theatre.

In the 1980s, he suffered from depression, bipolar disorder and other mental health problems, because of a lack of work and his considerable debts. This eventually led to a suicide attempt. In 1987, he disappeared from his home in Leicestershire for five days; it later emerged that he had taken the ferry to Dublin intending to kill himself. "I was in a horrible state", Grant said during an interview with Pamela Armstrong after the event, "I just had to get out of the house. I left the house and thumbed a lift to Melton Mowbray, and then got a train to Birmingham New Street where I sat sobbing in a station buffet. Everyone ignored me. Normally I get asked in the street something like 'When you back on telly then?', but not this time".

Grant started to write his first note to Kim, intending her to receive it after he had killed himself. "Tears streamed down my face as I wrote", he recalled. After hours of pounding the streets of Birmingham, Grant instead caught the ferry to Dublin, "It was a horrible night on that boat", he continued. "I'd been to Dublin before and it seemed such a nice place. I wanted to end it all, either by jumping in the River Liffey or ironically under a bus." Grant stayed at a guesthouse in Dublin to think things over. He called Kim, but there was no answer; she was at the time filming an appeal to find him. On the strength of the appeal, Grant eventually returned to England, where his absence had caused a small stir, which allowed him to gain a few more acting jobs.

In 1990, it was announced that On the Buses would be revived as a new show called Back on the Buses, and the entire cast, including Grant, Reg Varney, Stephen Lewis, Doris Hare, Michael Robbins and Anna Karen would appear on Wogan. Back on the Buses eventually fell through when funding from STV was not forthcoming. The project was to have been backed by STV's executive producer Bryan Izzard who had produced seven episodes of the series and the final spin-off film, Holiday on the Buses.

A further long gap in employment led to another suicide attempt in 1995, this time by carbon monoxide poisoning. Grant was discovered just in time, slumped over the steering wheel of his car, which was filled with exhaust fumes, and admitted to hospital for treatment. He and Kim took a holiday in Goa in India to recover and on their return, it seemed things were finally going right again. They moved to a small cottage in Church End Twyning, about a mile south of Twyning, near Tewkesbury in Gloucestershire with the ambition of making a fresh start. Grant lived very reclusively and neighbours would only see him when he was trimming his hedge. His last acting role was in Funny Money at Devonshire Park Theatre from July 1998. His "new life" did not last, as once more substantial bills continued to arrive and work did not. In despair, Grant made a third and final suicide attempt in 2003. This time he succeeded, dying in his fume-filled car in his garage with a hose attached to the exhaust pipe, and was found dead soon after.

Selected filmography

Film

Television
The following is a list of television programmes in which Grant was involved.

Publications

Plays

See also

Footnotes

References

Further reading

External links
 .
 .
 .

1932 births
2003 deaths
Alumni of RADA
British male comedy actors
English male film actors
English male stage actors
English male television actors
People from Hammersmith
2003 suicides
Suicides by carbon monoxide poisoning
Suicides in England
20th-century British Army personnel
Royal Artillery personnel
Military personnel from London